Kiewłaki  is a village in the administrative district of Gmina Brańsk, within Bielsk County, Podlaskie Voivodeship, in north-eastern Poland.

According to the 1921 census, the village was inhabited by 180 people, among whom 171 were Roman Catholic, 2 were Orthodox, and 7 were Mosaic. At the same time, 179 inhabitants declared Polish nationality, 1 Belarusian. There were 23 residential buildings in the village.

The village has an approximate population of 160 people.

References

Villages in Bielsk County